Ander García (born 5 April 1989) is a Spanish professional basketball player who played with Saski Baskonia.

Career
On 27 January 2008, García made his debut in the Liga ACB with Baskonia. After a first year in Baskonia with very few minutes, he decided to leave the team for playing in lower divisions.

In April 2017, he helped Sammic ISB to achieve the title of the 2016–17 LEB Plata and to promote to the second division.

References

External links
Profile at ACB.com
Profile at FEB.es

1989 births
Living people
Liga ACB players
Saski Baskonia players
Shooting guards
Spanish men's basketball players
Araberri BC players
People from Bergara
Sportspeople from Gipuzkoa
Basketball players from the Basque Country (autonomous community)